Flores de Alquiler (Leased Flowers) is the second studio album release from the Spanish music trio, La 5ª Estación. It was released throughout 2004 on various dates for North America, Latin America and Spain.

Track listing

Singles

El Sol No Regresa 
"El Sol No Regresa" (The Sun Doesn't Return) is the first of four singles from Flores de Alquiler.

Algo más 

"Algo más" (Something More) is the second of four singles from Flores de Alquiler.

Daría 
"Daría" (I Would Give) is the third of four radio singles from the band's second studio album. The track can also be found on the compilation album Now Esto Es Musica! Latino. An acoustic version of "Daría" can be found on the band's Acústico album.

Niña 
"Niña" (Girl) is the fourth and final radio single from the band's second album. It reached number 36 on the U.S. Billboard Latin Pop Airplay chart.

Reviews

Allmusic

Personnel
Spartak Babaev – violin
Javier Serrano – trumpet
Natalia Jimenez – harmonica, background chorus
Miguel Castro – guitar director
Natalia Jimenez – background chorus
Armando Avila – background chorus, producer
Carlos "Patato" Valdes – production assistant
Emilio Avila – production coordination
Gilda Oropeza – A&R
Guillermo Gutierrez – A&R
MVlado Meller – mastering
Fernando Velasco – photography

Charts

Certifications

References

La 5ª Estación albums
2004 albums
Song recordings produced by Armando Ávila